This is a list of episodes from the British animated television series Kipper, which ran from 5 September 1997 to 21 December 2000 in the United Kingdom.

Series overview
{|class="wikitable plainrowheaders" style="text-align:center;"
!colspan="2" rowspan="2"|Series
!rowspan="2"|Episodes
!colspan="2"|Originally aired
|-
!First aired
!Last aired
|-
|style="background: #FF7F00;"|
|[[List of Kipper episodes#Series 1 (1997)|1]]
|13
|
|
|-
|style="background: #81D8D0;"|
|[[List of Kipper episodes#Series 2 (1998)|2]]
|13
|
|
|-
|style="background: #90EE90;"|
|[[List of Kipper episodes#Series 3 (1999)|3]]
|13
|
|
|-
|style="background: #B1001A;"|
|[[List of Kipper episodes#Series 4 (1999)|4]]
|13
|
|
|-
|style="background: #FFFF00;"|
|[[List of Kipper episodes#Series 5 (2000)|5]]
|13
|
|
|-
|style="background: #FD6C9E;"|
|[[List of Kipper episodes#Series 6 (2000)|6]]
|13
|
|
|}

Episodes

Series 1 (1997)

Series 2 (1998)

Series 3 (1999)

Series 4 (1999)

Series 5 (2000)

Series 6 (2000)

References

Kipper
Kipper
Kipper